Timeless Secret is a line of anti-aging skin-care products sold by home delivery. They are advertised on infomercials featuring former Entertainment Tonight host Julie Moran.

The products were originally created by May and Michelle Wong, whose family had been using one of the ingredients, Pu-erh tea, as a beauty aid and anti-aging product for generations.

References

Cosmetics companies of the United States